Entomobrya atrocincta is a species of slender springtails in the family Entomobryidae. They display notable sexual dimorphism, rare in springtails, with the males being a vivid orange (occasionally with white or black bands), and the females being a duller tan.

References

Collembola
Articles created by Qbugbot
Animals described in 1896